Vanderhoof is a district municipality near the geographical centre of British Columbia, Canada. Covering 2.92 square kilometers., it has a population of about 4,500 within town limits, and offers services to nearly 10,000 people in nearby rural communities. Its main industries are forestry, agriculture, and related businesses. Tourism is also growing, and mining operations are being developed in the area. It has many elementary schools, and one major secondary school, Nechako Valley Secondary School (NVSS), comprising School District 91 Nechako Lakes. The College of New Caledonia has a regional campus there.

Via Rail's Jasper–Prince Rupert train serves the Vanderhoof railway station.

History
The municipality is named after Herbert Vanderhoof of Chicago, one of its founders. He was an employee of the Grand Trunk Pacific Development Company, a subsidiary of Grand Trunk Pacific Railway. The municipality's population rapidly expanded until World War II, when many of the town's men left to fight overseas. After the war, an increase in lumber prices and the construction of the Kenney Dam lead to increases in population again. Today Vanderhoof is a service centre in the eastern Bulkley-Nechako for surrounding communities, and the second-largest municipality in the regional district.

Demographics 

Ethnicity

Religion 
According to the 2021 census, religious groups in Vanderhoof included:
Irreligion (2,080 persons or 48.5%)
Christianity (2,065 persons or 48.2%)
Sikhism (40 persons or 0.9%)
Judaism (25 persons or 0.6%)
Buddhism (15 persons or 0.4%)
Hinduism (15 persons or 0.4%)
Islam (15 persons or 0.4%)
Indigenous Spirituality (10 persons or 0.2%)

Wildlife 
Vanderhoof is known for its bird sanctuary along the Nechako River. Many Canada geese, swans, and other migratory birds pass through Vanderhoof during their annual migrations. The Nechako is home to a number of fish species, including salmon and the endangered Nechako white sturgeon. Many hunters come to Vanderhoof in search of bear, moose, deer, cougar and elk.

Schools
Elementary:
Evelyn Dickson
W.L. McLeod 
Sinkutview 
Mapes

Secondary:
Nechako Valley Secondary School (NVSS
Northside Christian School
Valhalla High
Virtual School: EBUS Academy

Culture and recreation 

 Nechako Valley Exhibition Grounds- home of the Fall Fair (August), 2 riding arenas, and agricultural show facilities
 Vanderhoof Heritage Museum
 Vanderhoof Airport –  5,018-foot paved runway and two grass runways (5,200 feet and 3,200 feet)
 Vanderhoof Aquatic Centre – 6-lane 25m lap pool, climbing wall, 30-person hot tub, sauna, and 1500 sq. foot leisure pool
 Vanderhoof Skateboard Park
 Grand Reo Theatre – a restored 175-seat movie theatre
 Omineca Golf Course – par 72, 18 holes
 Disc Golf Course
 Vanderhoof Arena – indoor skating rink in the winter, home to Figure Skating Club, Speed Skating Club, Minor Hockey Club, other adult hockey recreation leagues, and a community centre hosting various events in the summer
 Vanderhoof Curling Club
 Riverside Park & Campground – birdwatching tower, playground, beach volleyball, picnic shelter, walking trails
 Ferland Park - playground, waterpark
 Bradley Park, Leiding Park, Vanderview Park –playgrounds
 Community Garden – greenhouse, raised beds, in-ground plots, public washroom
 Rip n' The North Bike Park – mountain bike trails
 Moore's Motocross Track – dirt bike track
 Community trail system
 Nechako White Sturgeon Conservation Centre – identifying, maintaining and potentially restoring critical sturgeon habitat in the Nechako River
 Nechako Valley Sporting Association – archery, hand gun range, fishing and hunting, cross-country skiing, trap shooting, Wilderness Watch
 Omineca Express – local weekly newspaper published Thursdays
 CIAM FM, "The Light 98.5 FM" – community radio station, also a rebroadcaster for CIAM radio network
 CBC Radio 1, 91.5 FM
 Real Country, 910 AM
 Vanderhoof Public Library
 Community Bus – free community transportation service (12-passenger capacity with 2 wheelchair positions)

Telegraph Trail

A telegraph line, set up in the 1890s for communication with the Klondike Gold Rush gold fields, was abandoned in the 1930s and later converted into a series of walking trails. A 10 km trail connects Hogsback Lake (near Vanderhoof) to Blackwater Road.

Community events

 Wild Goose Chase: held the first Sunday in May, this community 8 km, 5 km, and 3.5 km Fun Run brings out hundreds of participants and volunteers.
 Vanderhoof Chamber of Commerce Biennial Trade Show, scheduled in May on the "odd numbered" years.
 BC Rodeo - held in April
 Stoney Creek Elders Fishing Derby - May
 Hooterville Hoot: an annual classic car show, held in early June.
 Concert In The Park: July - Local talent performs for an afternoon and evening filled with great entertainment.
 Canada Day Celebration: - July 1
 Vanderhoof Farmers' Market: fresh locally grown produce, organic meat products, preserves, crafted goods and much more. Markets run Thursdays from June to September.
 Vanderhoof International Air show: Taking place biennially in August - showcasing many skilled pilots and their aircraft, as well as several static displays.
 Nechako Valley Exhibition: held the third weekend in August. A true country fair that is fun for the whole family.
 Recreation/Leisure Fair: held in early September to introduce clubs and recreational opportunities to the community.
 The Great Pumpkin Walk: Held annually, October 31 - With hand-carved pumpkins and "trick-or-treating" in the park, attended by thousands of residents—a safe and convenient place for families to spend Halloween night.  Followed by a fireworks display that lights up the entire Nechako River Valley.
 Parade of Lights and Midnight Madness: Held the first Saturday in December, this kicks off the Christmas time retail season with the light parade and crazy sales at many retail stores.

Climate
Vanderhoof has a humid continental climate (Köppen Dfb) with mild summers and cold winters.

See also
 Saik'uz First Nation

Notes

References

External links

 

District municipalities in British Columbia
Populated places in the Regional District of Bulkley-Nechako
Nechako Country